The European Commissioner for Innovation, Research, Culture, Education and Youth is a member of the European Commission. The portfolio was previously titled European Commissioner for Education, Culture, Youth and Sport until 2019 when it was merged with the European Commissioner for Research, Science and Innovation to form its current title.

The portfolio is responsible for policies in education and training, youth, sport, civil society, and culture. The commissioner leads the Directorate-General for Education, Youth, Sport and Culture.

History of the portfolio 

Commissioner Ján Figeľ was approved by the European Parliament in 2004 as the European Commissioner for Education, Training, Culture and Multilingualism. This was enlarged since the Prodi Commission with the addition of training and multilingualism (The Directorate-General is still just Directorate-General for Education and Culture).

However, when Romania joined the European Union on 1 January 2007, responsibility for multilingualism was handed over to the new Romanian commissioner, Leonard Orban. In its place the portfolio now also includes youth, sport and civil society. Figeľ describes his position is very orientated to "the citizens and their quality of life".

The commission has become increasingly active in education. The ERASMUS programme, which was established in 1987, is a student exchange programme promoting mobility of students between European universities. The Bologna process aims to create a European Higher Education Area where academic qualifications can be recognised across Europe. The European Institute of Technology is a proposed research university.

With the 2014 inauguration of the Juncker Commission, the portfolio was once again renamed – multilingualism was removed in favor of citizenship: "Education, Culture, Youth and Citizenship".  Citizenship in turn was soon replaced by sport. The title from 2014 to 2019 was thus European Commissioner for Education, Culture, Youth and Sport.

List of commissioners
The previous portfolio to the current was Culture, merged with Audiovisual policy and EP relations.

See also
Directorate-General for Education and Culture
Directorate-General for Interpretation
ERASMUS programme
European Institute of Innovation and Technology
Lux Prize for European Cinema

External links
 Commissioner's Website
 EU: Education and Training
 EU: Culture
 EU: Youth
 EU: Sport
 EU: Civil Society

References

European Union youth policy
Education, Culture, Multilingualism and Youth